Edith Hilda, Lady Ingold ( Usherwood; 
21 May 1898 – 1988) was a British chemist based in Leeds and London. Her career was unfairly overshadowed by that of her husband. She failed to gain much public recognition, despite being an innovative chemist and partner to her husband in his work on inorganic chemistry. She was known as Lady Ingold following her husband's knighthood.

Early life 
Edith Hilda Usherwood was born into a working-class family in Catford (south-east London).

Education 
She attended a girls' grammar school in Lewisham, and then had two years of private education in Horsham. She then moved to the North London Collegiate School after being awarded a Clothworker's Scholarship.

As an undergraduate at Royal Holloway College, Usherwood attained a BSc Hons in Chemistry (1916-1920) before completing her doctorate in 1923 at Imperial College London. As the doctoral degree was only introduced to British Universities in 1917 she was one of the earliest students to qualify. Her PhD project was on tautomers, isomers of molecules which differ only in the position of a labile hydrogen atom. Her doctoral supervisor was Martha Whiteley.

Her subsidiary subject was physics and this led to her research in physical organic chemistry and quantum mechanics. Following completion of her PhD she went on to complete a DSc.

She was president of the UCL Chemical and Physical society during the 1976-1977 academic year, one of the oldest and most prestigious societies at the university.

Personal life 
She married fellow Chemistry student Christopher Kelk Ingold in 1923 and went on to have three children. They had two daughters and a son, the chemist Keith Ingold.

References

English women chemists
English chemists
People educated at North London Collegiate School
1898 births
1988 deaths
People from Catford
Alumni of Royal Holloway, University of London
Alumni of Imperial College London
Academics of Imperial College London
Wives of knights